James Byrd may refer to:

James W. Byrd (born 1954), American Wyoming State Representative
James Byrd Jr. (1949–1998), African-American murder victim
Sgt. James Byrd, a fictional playable character in Spyro: Year of the Dragon

See also
James Bird (disambiguation)